Kalateh-ye Sadat-e Bala (also Romanized as Kalāteh-ye Sādāt-e Bālā; also known as Kalāteh-ye Sādāt-e ‘Olyā) is a village in Forumad Rural District, in the Central District of Meyami County, Semnan Province, Iran. At the 2006 census, its population was 40, in 11 families.

References 

Populated places in Meyami County